Santala railway station (abbrev. Sta,  and ) is a railway stop in the city of Hanko, Finland along the Hanko-Hyvinkää Railroad. The stop is located approximately 197 kilometers from Helsinki Central railway station. Local trains between Karis and Hanko stops there. The stop is located in the forest and its usage level is low though the Finnish national road 25 is near.

External links
Picture of the station

References 

Railway stations in Uusimaa
Hanko